
Gmina Radwanice is a rural gmina (administrative district) in Polkowice County, Lower Silesian Voivodeship, in south-western Poland.

Neighbouring gminas
Gmina Radwanice is bordered by the gminas of Chocianów, Gaworzyce, Jerzmanowa, Polkowice, Przemków and Żukowice.

Villages
The gmina contains the villages of Borów, Buczyna, Dobromil, Drożów, Drożyna, Jakubów, Kłębanowice, Łagoszów Wielki, Lipin, Nowa Kuźnia, Nowy Dwór, Przesieczna, Radwanice, Sieroszowice, Strogoborzyce, Teodorów and Ułanów.

References

Radwanice
Polkowice County